The 1995 Bank of the West Classic was a women's tennis tournament played on indoor carpet courts at the Oakland Alameda Coliseum in Oakland, California in the United States that was part of the Tier II category of the 1995 WTA Tour. It was the 24th edition of the tournament and was held from October 30 through November 5, 1995. Second-seeded Magdalena Maleeva won the singles title.

Finals

Singles

 Magdalena Maleeva defeated  Ai Sugiyama 6–3, 6–4
 It was Maleeva's 3rd singles title of the year and the 6th of her career.

Doubles

 Lori McNeil /  Helena Suková defeated  Katrina Adams /  Zina Garrison-Jackson 3–6, 6–4, 6–3

References

External links
 Official website
 ITF tournament edition details
 Tournament draws

Bank of the West Classic
Silicon Valley Classic
Bank of the West Classic
Bank of the West Classic
Bank of the West Classic
Bank of the West Classic